The Call of the East is a 1917 American silent drama film directed by George Melford and written by Beulah Marie Dix. The film stars Sessue Hayakawa, Tsuru Aoki, Jack Holt, Margaret Loomis, James Cruze, and Ernest Joy. The film was released on October 15, 1917, by Paramount Pictures. It is not known whether the film currently survives, which suggests that it is a lost film.

Plot
As described in a film magazine, Sheila Hepburn (Loomis), the half-sister of Alan Hepburn (Holt), is the daughter of a Japanese mother. While visiting Alan, who works in Tokyo, she attends a festival with her Japanese maid while wearing a Japanese kimono. There she meets the wealthy Arai Takada (Hayakawa), who is taken by the mysterious woman. Alan has dishonored and betrayed O'Mitsu (Aoki), and her brother Arai plans a terrible revenge. Alan loses heavily at cards to Arai and, to forget his losses, accompanies Arai to his country home. There Alan is about to be thrust into a pool of quicksand to die when Sheila appears, having been warned of Arai's plans. Dismayed that the woman he met at the festival is Alan's sister, Arai sees that she and Alan do not meet, but later agrees to release her brother as Sheila wins Arai's love and respect. At that moment Alan appears, having escaped from his prison, and strikes Arai down. Sheila bursts into tears and runs to the fallen man, and Alan, seeing his sister responding to the "call of the east," departs.

Cast 
Sessue Hayakawa as Arai Takada
Tsuru Aoki as O'Mitsu
Jack Holt as Alan Hepburn
Margaret Loomis as Sheila Hepburn
James Cruze as Janzo
Ernest Joy as Col. Bassett
Guy Oliver as Cadger
Jane Wolfe as Yuri

Reception
Like many American films of the time, The Call of the East was subject to cuts by city and state film censorship boards. The Chicago Board of Censors required that these six intertitles be cut: "My sister is an outcast, but the man who shamed her shall pay", "You are my beloved - isn't that enough?", "At Haksima, Hepburn shall pay for O'Mitsu", "Tonight your sister she shall pay the price", "I am ready to marry O'Mitsu", and "I decline the honor".

Criticism
The film allowed Americans to view the film without concerns about the taboo of miscegenation involving Arai Takada and Sheila Hepburn as an intertitle early in the film stated "In reality her mother was Japanese," and the plot indicates that, when Arai met Sheila at the festival, he believed she was Japanese because of the way she was dressed. In contrast, Alan Hepburn treats O'Mitsu simply as his mistress, and the plot requires Arai to ultimately accept the victimization of his sister.

References

External links 
 

1917 films
1910s English-language films
Silent American drama films
1917 drama films
Paramount Pictures films
Films directed by George Melford
American black-and-white films
American silent feature films
1910s American films